Moshe ben Rafael Attias, also known as Moshe Rafajlović and Zeki Effendi (Sarajevo, 1845 – 2 July 1916), was a Bosnian Jew who became a scholar of the Islamic faith and of medieval Persian literature.

Born to a prominent family of Sarajevo Sephardi Jews in the late Ottoman times, he spent most of his active life during the Austro-Hungarian administration of Bosnia and Herzegovina (1878–1914).

Moshe Attias attended an Ottoman state school in Sarajevo – open to all confessions but mainly attended by Bosnian Muslims – and studied according to an Islamic curriculum. He then moved to Istanbul to perfect his studies on Islamic religion and culture. There he became a scholar of the 13th century Persian poet and mystic Muslih-uddin Sa'di, the author of "Gulistan". Attias may have even become a Jewish sufi. Attias got the title of effendi, a scholar of Islam, which is visible from the Latin inscription on his grave. He was known in his last years as "Zeki Effendi".

He then returned to Sarajevo, where he joined the Ottoman civil service, working for the tax authorities. He remained in town as a financial advisor after the Austro-Hungarian takeover of the capital in 1878.

He was the treasurer of the Sarajevo Jewish society La Benevolencija, for which he kept a correspondence with Ángel Pulido in Madrid.

Zeki Effendi used to write in standard Castilian Spanish language, rather than in the Judeo-Spanish (Ladino) usually used by Sarajevo Jews, but still using the Hebrew alphabet.

The poet Abraham Aaron Capón commissioned him to write an authoritative history of the Bosnian Jews. Zeki Effendi published it in the short-lived Sarajevo Ladino periodical, La Alborada, under the pen name '‘el Amante de la Luz’ ("the light-lover") – a reference to his illuministic approach to historiography. He published in 1901 "La historia de los judiós de Bosna" (History of the Bosnian Jews), or "Konsezos de nuestros viezos". His most well-known historiographic piece concerns Rabbi Moshe Danon, "the rabbi of Stolac."

In 1908, his voice was recorded by Julius Subak on his trip to Sarajevo with Abraham A. Cappon – the record is kept at the Vienna Phonogrammarchiv, together with a 1907 recording of one of his poems.

In 1911, Zeki Effendi made a tour of the Balkans together with the renowned Spanish scholar of Sephardic balladry, Don Manuel Manrique de Lara, recording oral texts from the Sefardi culture of Bosnia-Herzegovina, Serbia and Kosovo.

Zeki Effendi is buried in the Old Jewish Cemetery in Sarajevo. His gravestone contains inscriptions in three scripts: Latin, Hebrew, and Arabic. His gravestone is possibly the only Jewish gravestone in the world containing both the Hebrew and Arabic script.

References

Bibliography 
[EN] Phillips Cohen, Julia and Sarah Abrevaya Stein "Sephardic Scholarly Worlds: Towards a Novel Geography of Modern Jewish History" Jewish Quarterly Review 100.3 (Summer 2010), pp. 349–384.
[ES] Liebl, Christian "Sefarad im Phonogrammarchiv: Cappon, Cantors and Canetti" in Michael Studemund-Halévy, Christian Liebl e Ivana Vucina Simóvic, eds. Sefarad an der Donau. La lengua y literatura de los sefardíes en tierras de los Habsburgo, Barcelona, Tirocinio, 2013, pp. 371–384.
[EN] Liebl, Christian, "'Avíe úne vez...': Julius Subak, Max A. Luria and phonographic field research among Sephardic communities in the Balkans", in: Los sefardíes ante los retos del mundo contemporáneo: identidad y mentalidades, Paloma Díaz-Mas y María Sánchez Pérez (eds.), Madrid, CSIC, 2010, pp. 240–241.
[ES] Romero, Elena, La creación literaria en lengua sefardí, Madrid, Mapfre, 1992, pp. 206.
[HE] Gaon, Moshe David, Yehudé hamizra beerets Yisrael, 2 vols., Jerusalén, Azriel, 1937, p. 514.
[ES] Pulido, Angel, Españoles sin patria y la raza sefardí, Madrid, Sucesores de Rivadeneyra, 1904, pp. 330–331.
[SCB] Muhamed Nezirovic', '‘Historija Bosanskih Jevreja Mosˇe (Rafaela) Atijasa – Zeki Efendije,'’ Prilozi 29 (2000): 245–60

Bosnia and Herzegovina Sephardi Jews
Bosnia and Herzegovina people of Spanish descent
Jewish Bosnian history
Jewish scholars of Islam
Judaeo-Spanish-language writers
1845 births
1916 deaths